Gau (German ,  ,   or goa ) is a Germanic term for a region within a country, often a former or current province. It was used in the Middle Ages, when it can be seen as roughly corresponding to an English shire. The administrative use of the term was revived as a subdivision during the period of Nazi Germany in 1933–1945. It still appears today in regional names, such as the Rheingau or Allgäu.

Middle Ages

Etymology
The Germanic word is reflected in Gothic gawi (neuter; genitive gaujis) and early Old High German gewi, gowi (neuter) and in some compound names -gawi as in Gothic (e.g. Durgawi "Canton of Thurgau", Alpagawi "Allgäu"), later gâi, gôi, and after loss of the stem suffix gaw, gao, and with motion to the feminine as gawa besides gowo (from gowio). Old Saxon shows further truncation to gâ, gô. As an equivalent of Latin pagus, a gau is analogous with a pays of the Kingdom of France, or of Lotharingia.

Old English, by contrast, has only traces of the word, which was ousted by scire from an early time, in names such as Noxga gā, Ohtga gā and perhaps in gōman, ġēman "yeoman", which would then correspond to the Old High German gaumann, although the Oxford English Dictionary prefers connection of yeoman to young.

Conceptual history

In the Carolingian Empire,  a Gau was a subdivision of the realm, further divided into Hundreds. The Frankish gowe thus appear to correspond roughly to the civitas in other barbarian kingdoms (Visigoths, Burgundians, or the Italian Kingdom of the Lombards). After the end of the Migration Period, the Hundred (centena or hunaria, Old High German  huntari) had become a term for an administrative unit or jurisdiction, independent of the figure hundred. The Frankish usage contrasts with Tacitus' Germania, where a pagus was a subdivision of a tribal territory or civitas, corresponding to the Hundred, i.e. areas liable to provide a hundred men under arms, or containing roughly a hundred homesteads each, further divided into vici (villages or farmsteads). Charlemagne, by his capitulary legislation, adopted the comitatus subdivision and appointed local rulers as deputies of the central Imperial authority.

In the German-speaking lands east of East Francia, the  formed the unit of administration of the realm during the 9th and 10th centuries and ruled by a gaugrave (Gaugraf i.e. "gau count"). Similar to many shires in England, during the Middle Ages, many such  came to be known as counties or Grafschaften, the territory of a Graf (count) within the Holy Roman Empire. Such a count or  would originally have been an appointed governor, but the position generally became an hereditary vassal princedom, or fief in most of continental Europe.

Nazi period

The term Gau was revived in German historical research in the 18th and 19th centuries, and was considered an ancient administration structure of Germanic peoples. It was adopted in the 1920s as the name given to the regional associations of the Nazi Party (NSDAP). Each Gau denoted an administrative region, created by a party statute dated 22 May 1926.  Each Gau was headed by a Gauleiter. The original 33 Gaue were generally coterminous with the Reichstag election districts of the Weimar Republic, based on the constituent states (Länder) and the provinces of Prussia. Following the suppression of the political institutions of the Länder in the course of the Nazi Gleichschaltung process and the appointment of Reichsstatthalter (Reich Governors) in 1933, the Gaue became the de facto administrative regions of the government and each individual Gauleiter had considerable power within his territory.

Reichsgaue

With the beginning of the annexation of neighbouring territories by Nazi Germany in the late 1930s, a new unit of civil administration, the Reichsgau, was established. German-speaking territories annexed to Germany from 1938 were generally organised into Reichsgaue.  Unlike the pre-existing Gaue, the new Reichsgaue formally combined the spheres of both party and state administration.

Following the annexation of Austria in 1938, the country, briefly renamed "Ostmark" between 1938 and 1942, was sub-divided into seven Reichsgaue.  These had boundaries broadly the same as the former Austrian Länder (states), with the Tyrol and Vorarlberg being merged as "Tyrol-Vorarlberg", Burgenland being divided between Styria and "Lower Danube" (Niederdonau, the renamed Lower Austria). Upper Austria was also renamed "Upper Danube" (Oberdonau), thus eliminating the name of "Austria" (Österreich in German) from the official map.  A small number of boundary changes also took place, the most significant of which was the massive expansion of Vienna's official territory, at the expense of "Lower Danube".

Northern and eastern territory annexed from the dismembered Czechoslovakia were mainly organised as the Reichsgau of Sudetenland, with territory to the south annexed to the Reichsgaue of Lower and Upper Danube.

Following the Axis invasion of Poland in 1939, territories of the Pomeranian and Poznań voivodeships as well as the western half of Łódź voivodeship were reannexed to Germany as the Reichsgaue of Danzig-Westpreussen (which also incorporated the former Free City of Danzig) and Wartheland. Other parts of Nazi-occupied Poland were incorporated to bordering gaus of East Prussia and Upper Silesia i.e. Zichenau (region); and Silesian voivodeship with the counties of Oświęcim, Biała respectively.

After the successful invasion of France in 1940, Germany re-annexed Alsace-Lorraine.  The former département of Moselle was incorporated into the Gau of Saar-Palatinate, while Bas-Rhin and Haut-Rhin became part of the Gau Baden. Similarly, the formerly independent state of Luxembourg was annexed to Koblenz-Trier, and the Belgian territories of Eupen and Malmedy were incorporated into Cologne-Aachen.

Legacy in topography
The medieval term Gau (sometimes Gäu; gouw in Dutch) has survived as (second, more generic) component of the names of certain regions – some named after a river – in Germany, Austria, Alsace, Switzerland, Belgium, South Tyrol, and the Netherlands.

 Aargau, Switzerland
 Allgäu, Germany
 Breisgau, Germany (h/e English exonyms: Brisgaw/Brisgow)
 Buchsgau, Switzerland
 Chiemgau, Germany
 Eastergoa and Westergoa in Friesland, Netherlands
 Elsgau, Switzerland
 Fivelgo around the Fivel in Groningen, Netherlands 
 Flachgau, Austria
 Gau Algesheim, Germany
 Gäuboden, Germany
 Haistergau, Germany

 Haspengouw, Belgium
 Hegau, Germany
 Hennegau (Dutch: Henegouwen; English: Heynowes), French: Hainaut), Belgium
 Hunsingo around the Hunze in Groningen, Netherlands
 Bliesgau, Germany
 Huosigau, Germany
 Illergau, Germany
 Kraichgau, Germany
 Linzgau, Germany
 Lungau, Austria
 Oberammergau, Germany
 Pinzgau, Austria
 Pongau, Austria
 Prättigau, Switzerland

 Rammachgau, Germany
 Rheingau, Germany
 Rupertigau, Germany
 Saargau, Germany
 Sisgau, Switzerland
 Sundgau, in the southeastern corner of Alsace (Suntgow - h/e English exonym)
 Tennengau, Austria
 Thurgau, Switzerland
 Ufgau, Germany
 Unterammergau, Germany
 Vinschgau, Italy
 Wasgau, Germany
 Wormsgau, Germany
 Zabergäu, Germany

References
Notes

Bibliography
 Der große Atlas der Weltgeschichte. Munich: Orbis Verlag, 1990.  (book of historical maps)

External links
 WorldStatesmen – see various present countries once under Nazi rule (here Belgium)
 Shoa.de – List of Gaue and Gauleiter 
 Liste mittelalterlicher Gaue, a listing of medieval gau. 

 
German words and phrases
Nazi terminology
Types of administrative division
Former subdivisions of Germany